Georges Henri Boivin,  (December 26, 1882 – August 7, 1926) was a Canadian politician.

Born in Granby, Quebec, the son of Henri Boivin and Sarah Bray, Boivin was educated at Granby Academy, St. Joseph's College, and Granby Mannoir College in Marieville. He received a Bachelor of Arts degree in 1902 from Laval University in Quebec City. He studied law in the offices of Greenshields, Heneker & Mitchell in Montreal, and was admitted to the bar of the Province of Quebec in 1907. From 1908 to 1912, he was an advocate and barrister with the firm of McKeown & Boivin in Sweetsburg, Quebec. In 1907, he was appointed Crown Prosecutor for the District of Bedford.

He was elected to the House of Commons of Canada for the Quebec riding of Shefford in the 1911 federal election. A Liberal, he was re-elected in 1917, 1921, and 1925. From 1918 to 1921, he was the Deputy Speaker and Chairman of Committees of the Whole of the House of Commons. From 1925 to 1926, he was the Minister of Customs and Excise.

He was married to Helen Comeau and had three children: Sarah Marguerite, James Joseph Henry, and Marcel George Wilfrid, who was also an MP.

References
 Men of today in the Eastern Townships
 

1882 births
1926 deaths
Liberal Party of Canada MPs
Laurier Liberals
Members of the House of Commons of Canada from Quebec
Members of the King's Privy Council for Canada